Sledge Island, or Ayak Island, is a small island in the Bering Sea.

Geography
Administratively this island belongs to the Nome Census Area, Alaska.

The island is part of the Bering Sea unit of the Alaska Maritime National Wildlife Refuge.

History
This island was named on August 5, 1778, by Captain James Cook, who commented: "We found, a little way from the shore where we landed, a sledge, which occasioned this name being given to the island." Martin Sauer, the secretary of the 1791 Russian expedition who sailed under orders from Catherine II of Russia, claimed in 1802 that the Inuit name of this island is "Ayak."

Captain Frederick Beechey observed: "It is singular that this island, which was named Sledge Island by Captain Cook, from the circumstances of one of these implements being found upon it, should be called by a word signifying the same thing in Esquimaux language."

The island was featured in seasons 8 and 11 of Bering Sea Gold, as a site to prospect and mine for seafloor placer gold.

Demographics

Sledge Island first appeared on the 1880 U.S. Census as the unincorporated Inuit village of Aziak. All 50 of its residents were Inuit. It returned again in 1890 as Sledge Island, with 67 residents (all native). However, this included the residents of the island (listed as the village of "Ahyak") and three adjacent small villages on the mainland, including Okinoyoktokawik, Senikave & Sunvalluk. These were located approximately 19–20 miles west of present-day Nome, near a feature called West Point. It has not reported in any census since.

References

External links
 USGS-GNIS
 Picture of the island from the air
 Martin Sauer's voyages

Islands of the Bering Sea
Islands of Alaska
Islands of Nome Census Area, Alaska
Alaska Maritime National Wildlife Refuge
Protected areas of Nome Census Area, Alaska
Islands of Unorganized Borough, Alaska